Bellbrook - Sugarcreek Local School District is a school district in Bellbrook, Ohio, USA. Its schools draw their students from families in the City of Bellbrook and Sugarcreek Township. The City of Bellbrook, which is in Sugarcreek Township, has been known for having history dating back to the 19th century.

Parent/Teacher Organization 
The Parent/Teacher Organization (PTO) meetings are held the 2nd Monday of every month at Bellbrook Middle School. The PTO helps the District by providing money from a number of fundraisers. Some of these are Market Day, Entertainment Books and Amazon.com.

Bellbrook-Sugarcreek Board of Education/Bellbrook-Sugarcreek Education Foundation 
The Bellbrook-Sugarcreek Education Foundation is a non-profit organization. It is another way the Sugarcreek District receives money not available from public funds.

Schools

Bellbrook Middle School Grades: 6-8
Bellbrook High School Grades: 9-12
Stephen Bell Elementary Grades: K-2
Bell Creek Intermediate School: 3-5

See also
 Bellbrook, Ohio
 Sugarcreek Township, Greene County, Ohio

References

School districts in Ohio
Education in Greene County, Ohio